Claragh Mountain or Clara Mountain (Irish:Sléibhe na Clárach) is a  mountain in Millstreet,  north-west Cork in Ireland. It is part of the Derrynasaggart Mountain range which spreads across the Cork-Kerry border.

Location and trail
The foot of the mountain is located 1 km west of Millstreet, the mountain overlooks the town with its cross near the summit. The mountain is very popular to climb and also has a walking trail around the mountain called the Claragh Loop.

Gallery

References

Mountains and hills of County Cork